Lion Schweers (born 1 April 1996) is a German football defender who plays for Wuppertaler SV.

Club career
After five years at Preußen Münster, Schweers left the club at the end of the 2018–19 season. On 12 July 2019, he joined Würzburger Kickers on a two-year deal. In Würzburg, the defender made five 3. Liga appearances and two regional Bavarian Cup appearances, before being loaned out to Regionalliga Südwest club SV Elversberg until the end of the season in January 2020.

References

External links
 

1996 births
Living people
Association football defenders
German footballers
SC Preußen Münster players
Würzburger Kickers players
SV Elversberg players
Wuppertaler SV players
3. Liga players
Regionalliga players
2. Bundesliga players
Footballers from Dortmund